Lactide is the lactone cyclic ester derived by multiple esterification between two (usually) or more molecules from lactic acid (2-hydroxypropionic acid) or other hydroxy carboxylic acid.  They are designated as dilactides, trilactides, etc., according to the number of hydroxy acid residues. The dilactide derived from lactic acid has the formula (OCHMeCO2)2. All lactides are colorless or white solids.  This lactide has attracted interest because it is derived from abundant renewable resources and is the precursor to a biodegradable plastic.

Stereoisomers
The dilactide derived from lactic acid can exist in three different stereoisomeric forms.  This complexity arises because lactic acid is chiral.  These enantiomers do not racemize readily.  

 All three stereoisomers undergo epimerisation in the presence of organic and inorganic bases in solution.

Polymerization
Lactide can be polymerized to polylactic acid (polylactide).  Depending on the catalyst, syndiotactic or a heterotactic polymers can result.  The resulting materials, polylactic acid, have many attractive properties.

References 

Lactones
Dioxanes
Monomers